Moffat Mutumbo Sinkala (date of birth unknown, died June 2004) was a Zambian footballer. He competed in the men's tournament at the 1980 Summer Olympics.

References

External links
 
 
 

Year of birth missing
2004 deaths
Zambian footballers
Zambia international footballers
Olympic footballers of Zambia
Footballers at the 1980 Summer Olympics
Place of birth missing
Association football defenders
Nchanga Rangers F.C. players